In mathematical optimization theory, duality or the duality principle is the principle that optimization problems may be viewed from either of two perspectives, the primal problem or the dual problem. If the primal is a minimization problem then the dual is a maximization problem (and vice versa). Any feasible solution to the primal (minimization) problem is at least as large as any feasible solution to the dual (maximization) problem. Therefore, the solution to the primal is an upper bound to the solution of the dual, and the solution of the dual is a lower bound to the solution of the primal. This fact is called weak duality.

In general, the optimal values of the primal and dual problems need not be equal. Their difference is called the duality gap. For convex optimization problems, the duality gap is zero under a constraint qualification condition. This fact is called strong duality.

Dual problem
Usually the term "dual problem" refers to the Lagrangian dual problem but other dual problems are used – for example, the Wolfe dual problem and the Fenchel dual problem. The Lagrangian dual problem is obtained by forming the Lagrangian of a minimization problem by using nonnegative Lagrange multipliers to add the constraints to the objective function, and then solving for the primal variable values that minimize the original objective function.  This solution gives the primal variables as functions of the Lagrange multipliers, which are called dual variables, so that the new problem is to maximize the objective function with respect to the dual variables under the derived constraints on the dual variables (including at least the nonnegativity constraints).

In other words, if  exists,  is the minimum of the function  and the infimum (greatest lower bound) of the function is attained.

If there are constraint conditions, these can be built into the function  by letting  where  is a suitable function on  that has a minimum 0 on the constraints, and for which one can prove that .  The latter condition is trivially, but not always conveniently, satisfied for the characteristic function (i.e.  for  satisfying the constraints and  otherwise). Then extend  to a perturbation function   such that .

The duality gap is the difference of the right and left hand sides of the inequality

where  is the convex conjugate in both variables and  denotes the supremum (least upper bound).

Duality gap 

The duality gap is the difference between the values of any primal solutions and any dual solutions. This value is always greater than or equal to 0 (for minimization problems). The duality gap is zero if and only if strong duality holds. Otherwise the gap is strictly positive and weak duality holds.

In computational optimization, another "duality gap" is often reported, which is the difference in value between any dual solution and the value of a feasible but suboptimal iterate for the primal problem. This alternative "duality gap" quantifies the discrepancy between the value of a current feasible but suboptimal iterate for the primal problem and the value of the dual problem; the value of the dual problem is, under regularity conditions, equal to the value of the convex relaxation of the primal problem: The convex relaxation is the problem arising replacing a non-convex feasible set with its closed convex hull and with replacing a non-convex function with its convex closure, that is the function that has the epigraph that is the closed convex hull of the original primal objective function.

Linear case 

Linear programming problems are optimization problems in which the objective function and the constraints are all linear. In the primal problem, the objective function is a linear combination of n variables. There are m constraints, each of which places an upper bound on a linear combination of the n variables. The goal is to maximize the value of the objective function subject to the constraints. A solution is a vector (a list) of n values that achieves the maximum value for the objective function.

In the dual problem, the objective function is a linear combination of the m values that are the limits in the m constraints from the primal problem. There are n dual constraints, each of which places a lower bound on a linear combination of m dual variables.

Relationship between the primal problem and the dual problem 
In the linear case, in the primal problem, from each sub-optimal point that satisfies all the constraints, there is a direction or subspace of directions to move that increases the objective function. Moving in any such direction is said to remove slack between the candidate solution and one or more constraints. An infeasible value of the candidate solution is one that exceeds one or more of the constraints.

In the dual problem, the dual vector multiplies the constraints that determine the positions of the constraints in the primal. Varying the dual vector in the dual problem is equivalent to revising the upper bounds in the primal problem. The lowest upper bound is sought. That is, the dual vector is minimized in order to remove slack between the candidate positions of the constraints and the actual optimum. An infeasible value of the dual vector is one that is too low. It sets the candidate positions of one or more of the constraints in a position that excludes the actual optimum.

This intuition is made formal by the equations in Linear programming: Duality.

Nonlinear case 
In nonlinear programming, the constraints are not necessarily linear. Nonetheless, many of the same principles apply.

To ensure that the global maximum of a non-linear problem can be identified easily, the problem formulation often requires that the functions be convex and have compact lower level sets.

This is the significance of the Karush–Kuhn–Tucker conditions. They provide necessary conditions for identifying local optima of non-linear programming problems. There are additional conditions (constraint qualifications) that are necessary so that it will be possible to define the direction to an optimal solution. An optimal solution is one that is a local optimum, but possibly not a global optimum.

The strong Lagrangian principle: Lagrange duality 

Given a nonlinear programming problem in standard form

with the domain  having non-empty interior, the Lagrangian function  is defined as

 

The Lagrange dual function  is defined as

 

The dual function g is concave, even when the initial problem is not convex, because it is a point-wise infimum of affine functions.  The dual function yields lower bounds on the optimal value  of the initial problem; for any  and any  we have .

If a constraint qualification such as Slater's condition holds and the original problem is convex, then we have strong duality, i.e. .

Convex problems 
For a convex minimization problem with inequality constraints,
 
the Lagrangian dual problem is
 
where the objective function is the Lagrange dual function. The problem  
 
is called the Wolfe dual problem. This problem may be difficult to deal with computationally, because the objective function is not concave in the joint variables . Also, the equality constraint  is nonlinear in general, so the Wolfe dual problem is typically a nonconvex optimization problem. In any case, weak duality holds.

History 

According to George Dantzig, the duality theorem for linear optimization was conjectured by John von Neumann immediately after Dantzig presented the linear programming problem. Von Neumann noted that he was using information from his  game theory, and conjectured that two person zero sum matrix game was equivalent to linear programming. Rigorous proofs were first published in 1948 by Albert W. Tucker and his group. (Dantzig's foreword to Nering and Tucker, 1993)

See also
 Convex duality
 Duality
 Relaxation (approximation)

Notes

References

Books

Articles
 
 
 Duality in Linear Programming Gary D. Knott

Convex optimization
Linear programming